Montreal's New York Life Insurance Building (also known as the Quebec Bank Building) is an office building at Place d'Armes in what is now known as Old Montreal, erected in 1887-1889. At the time of its completion, it was the tallest commercial building in Montreal with the first eight floors were designed for retail office space, that quickly filled with the city's best lawyers and financiers. When the clock tower was completed, the owner filled the ninth and tenth floors with the largest legal library in the entire country as a gift to tenants. The building is next to another historic office tower, Aldred Building.

History

The New York Life Insurance Building was built by architects Babb, Cook and Willard and contractor Peter Lyall for the New York Life Insurance Company as its office in Canada. The final cost was $750,000. The Old Red Sandstone used in the construction was imported from Dumfriesshire, Scotland.

New York Life selected the site on Place D’Armes because it was near the Montreal business hub. Before construction began, crews demolished l’Hotel Compain and another 2 story building that occupied the lots. The building first appeared on 1890 insurance map.

Quebec Bank purchased the building in 1909 and occupied the ground floor before being absorbed into the Royal Bank of Canada in 1917. The structure still bears the bank's name carved over the entrance.

The building is near Place-d'Armes Metro, and is adjacent to other prominent Montreal landmarks, such as the Aldred Building (1931), the Bank of Montreal Building (1859/1901), the Place d'Armes Hotel, Notre-Dame Basilica and 500 Place D'Armes.

Architecture

The New York Life Building was inspired by Italian Renaissance and buildings in New York and was one of the first major Montreal buildings which did not use the local grey stone but instead used imported red sandstone. The stone required cutting which was done in Lyall workshop located on Bishop Street. The building has a “hybrid structure combining a frame - iron beams, girders and two sets of columns per floor - and bearing walls brick.” Architects used steel to construct the floors and the roof but employed masonry walls to support the structure. Henry Beaumont carved the significant external decorative elements such as the arabesque in the entrance archway, spandrel panels and pilaster capitals. The ornamental iron gate is by the E. Chanteloup workshop in Montreal.

The building contains eight floors and has a height of  including the clock tower. It has a quasi-rectangular shape and has a land area of  Total floor area including all floors is   Interior walls in the small vestibule and the halls are covered in marble and the ceiling has a decorative plaster resembling Renaissance ornamentation. The staircase railing consists of ornamental iron with a finished wood banister.

The office building is located on a corner lot and has façade on Place D’Armes as well as on rue Saint-Jacques. The original address was 13 Place d’Armes Hills but was later changed to its current address 511 Place D’Armes.

Owners modernized the third, fourth and fifth floors in 1952, and renovated the basement in 1970. In 1971, they added stairs between fifth floor and the roof. Subsequent owners completed further renovations in the 1980s and undertook an additional restoration project in 2006-2007 which included adding two residential penthouses on the roof. One of these is occupied by the current building owner.

Owners

The building’s original name was New York Life Building but in 1909 became home of Quebec Bank. The building was also known as Bank of Quebec building and Montreal Trust building but still is referred to by its original name.  The building has changed hands many times and had a number of notable tenants, including the Montreal Real Trust Company, London and Lancashire Insurance Co., the National Bank of Canada and the Société de Fiducie du Quebec. The Société de Fiducie du Quebec occupied the building for six years and sold it to Les immeubles Bona Ltée who performed many upgrades to the building. 
Akelius Montreal Ltd. acquired the property on January 31, 2020 and are the current owners.

References

Further reading
Rémillard, François, Old Montreal — A Walking Tour, Ministère des Affaires culturelles du Québec,  1992
Demchinskey, Bryan. Montreal; Then and Now. Montreal: The Gazette, 1985.
Forget, Madeleine. Gratte-Ciel de Montreal. Montreal: Editions du Meridien, 1990.
Grande Bibliothèque "Bibliothèque et archives nationales du Québec.” Grande Bibliothèque 
HUSTAK, ALAN. "Montreal's First Skyscraper (46 Metres) is Still in use." The Gazette, 2 January 1992. 
London, Mark. "Essence of City's Evolution is found in Place d'Armes." The Gazette, 12 July 1986. 
Pinard, Guy. Montreal: Son Histoire Son Architecture tome1. Montreal: La Presse, 1987.
Répertoire d’architecture tradiotonnelle sur le territore de la Communaute urbaine de Montreal. Montreal : Communaute urbaine de Montreal, Service de la planification du territoire, 1983.
Ville De Montreal. "La Place d’Armes.” Vieux Montreal. 31 May 2010. 
Ville De Montreal. "Evaluation Foncière” Ville De Montreal. 02 Mar, 2012. 
Ville De Montreal. "The rewards of a job well done Opération patrimoine architectural de Montréal.” Vieux Montreal. 
Wolfe, Joshua and Cecile Grenier. Discover Montreal; An Architecture and Historical Guide. Montreal: Libre Expression, 1991.

External links
Gazette article, "The tallest of them all (in 1888)"

Babb, Cook and Willard buildings
Commercial buildings in Montreal
Clock towers in Canada
Commercial buildings completed in 1889
Landmarks in Montreal
New York Life Insurance Company
Old Montreal
Romanesque Revival architecture in Canada
Sandstone buildings in Canada